Saulepi is a village in Lääneranna Parish, Pärnu County, in southwestern Estonia, on the coast of the Gulf of Riga. It has only 7 inhabitants (as of 1 January 2011).

Saulepi Manor (Saulep) was established in 1797 by detaching it from the nearby Vana-Varbla Manor (Alt-Werpel). Simple wooden main building was constructed in the middle of the 19th century. Nowadays it is a private property.

The islets Kõrksaar and Rootsiku laid also belong to Saulepi village.

References

External links
Website of Saulepi region (Kulli, Maade, Matsi, Õhu, Rädi, Raespa, Saare, Saulepi and Vaiste villages) 

Villages in Pärnu County
Kreis Wiek